Club Atlético Candelaria are a lower league football club from the city of Candelaria in the province of Misiones in Argentina.

They currently play in Torneo Argentino C which is the regionalised 5th tier of Argentinian football. They won promotion to Torneo Argentino A in 2003/04 but only survived 2 seasons before succumbing to relegation back to Argentino B.

Candalaria finished second bottom of their group in the Apertura and Clausura of Torneo Argentino B 2006–2007 condemning them to relegation to Argentino C which is the lowest level of football in the AFA league system.

Trophies
Torneo Argentino B: 1
2003-04

See also

Argentine football league system
List of football clubs in Argentina

External links
 Club website

Candelaria
Association football clubs established in 1941